Mahmoud Al-Humayd (born 5 September 1993) is a Saudi Arabian weightlifter. In 2021, he represented Saudi Arabia at the 2020 Summer Olympics in Tokyo, Japan. He competed in the men's 73 kg event.

At the 2017 Asian Indoor and Martial Arts Games held in Ashgabat, Turkmenistan, he won the bronze medal in the men's 69kg event.

In 2018, he competed in the men's 69 kg event at the Asian Games held in Jakarta, Indonesia.

References

External links 
 

Living people
1993 births
Place of birth missing (living people)
Saudi Arabian male weightlifters
Asian Games competitors for Saudi Arabia
Weightlifters at the 2014 Asian Games
Weightlifters at the 2018 Asian Games
Weightlifters at the 2020 Summer Olympics
Olympic weightlifters of Saudi Arabia
20th-century Saudi Arabian people
21st-century Saudi Arabian people